Nilhan Osmanoglu is a Turkish businesswoman. A member of the Osmanoğlu family, the direct heirs of the Ottoman Sultans, the former rulers of Turkey, she is the granddaughter of current family head Harun Osman. She runs a company selling jewelry, clothing, and other housewares in Ottoman styles.

Galatasaray Island dispute 
Osmanoglu claimed the ownership of Galatasaray Island in 2017. Galatasaray Island, which Nilhan Osmanoğlu called "Grandpa" and wanted, seems to belong to Galatasaray Sports Club, according to the records. According to the legal practice, due to the "10-year statute of limitations" period, there is no opportunity to take any legal action against the island in Turkey.Sultan II. Abdülhamit's grandson, Nilhan Osmanoğlu, claimed the right to Galatasaray Island in the Bosphorus, and Galatasaray Sports Club management objected to this situation.

According to the records in the General Directorate of Land Registry and Cadastre under the Ministry of Environment and Urbanization, the first title deed registration of Galatasaray Island belonged to the chief architect Serkiz Efendi in 1880. The island was registered in the name of Government-i Seniyye-i Osmaniyye in 1909 after Serkiz Efendi died. As a result of a lawsuit filed in 1941, a family owns the island after Serkiz journeyman proves that they are his heirs. In the cadastral works carried out in 1948, the registration of the island is made on this family. According to the records, the owners then gradually sell their shares to Galatasaray Sports Club, and the last records for the island include these transactions.

Lack of legal options 
Since there has been no objection to Galatasaray Island since the owners sold their shares to Galatasaray Sports Club, and there is no mistake in the name of the island's sports club, all domestic legal remedies for claiming rights here seem to be closed.

References

1987 births
Living people
21st-century Turkish businesspeople
Ottoman dynasty